Lucius Plautius Lamia Silvanus (c. 110 – aft. 145) was a Roman senator.

Life
He was suffect consul for the nundinium of March-April 145 with Lucius Poblicola Priscus as his colleague.

Silvanus was the son of Lucius Fundanius Lamia Aelianus and wife Rupilia. According to the Augustan History, Silvanus married Aurelia Fadilla (died 135), daughter of Antoninus Pius and Faustina the Elder. 

The Augustan History claims that Fabia Orestilla, the wife of Gordian I, was a descendant of the Emperor Antoninus Pius through her father Fulvus Antoninus, a descendant of Silvanus. Modern historians have dismissed this name and her information as false, as they believe his wife was the granddaughter of the Greek Sophist, consul, and tutor Herodes Atticus .

References 

2nd-century Romans
Lamia
Suffect consuls of Imperial Rome
Year of birth uncertain
Nerva–Antonine dynasty
110s births
Year of death unknown